Lost Cause is a mixtape by Canadian rapper Tory Lanez. It was released on October 1, 2014, for free download on hosting music websites. Production comes from Daniel Worthy, Grave Goods, Ryan Hemsworth, and RL Grime, among others. The mixtape is supported by the singles, "The Mission", "Henny in Hand", "Mama Told Me" and "I-95".

Background
After releasing his Fargo Fridays series Tory started to prepare for his mixtape. On August 14, 2014, he released the first single to the mixtape, "The Mission", to celebrate the announcement of his tour that was taking place in Houston, Los Angeles, New York, Toronto, Burlington, Dallas, and Atlanta. Week after week since then he was releasing the others, "Henny in Hand", "Mama Told Me", and "I-95". The tickets were sold on the website SWAVENATION. The mixtape was delayed for two days and was originally supposed to be released on September 29, 2014. To hold fans over has released a music video for, "The Godfather". On November 10, 2014, he released the music video for the tenth song, "The Mission". In February 2015, the music video for "Henny in Hand", was released.

Track listing

Notes
"The Godfather" was sampled of the Love Theme from The Godfather by Nino Rota.

References

2014 mixtape albums
Tory Lanez albums